The Toronto Rock are a lacrosse team based in Toronto playing in the National Lacrosse League (NLL). The 2015 season is the 18th in franchise history, and 17th as the Rock.

Regular season

Current standings

Game log

Regular season

Playoffs 

* 10-minute series tiebreaker mini-game played immediately following game 2

Roster

Transactions

Trades

Entry Draft
The 2014 NLL Entry Draft took place on September 22, 2014. The Rock made the following selections:

See also
2015 NLL season

References

Toronto
Toronto Rock
2015 in Canadian sports